Frasor is a surname. Notable people with the surname include:

Bobby Frasor (born 1986), American basketball player and coach
Jason Frasor (born 1977), American baseball player

See also
Frasier (disambiguation)
Fraser (disambiguation)
Frazer (disambiguation)
Frazier